Altdorf railway station is a railway station in the Swiss canton of Uri and municipality of Altdorf. The station is situated on the Gotthard railway north of its crossing of the Alps, and is the most southerly station before that line splits into the older route via Erstfeld and the original Gotthard Tunnel, and the newer route via the Gotthard Base Tunnel. The station was reconstructed between 2019 and 2021.

Layout and connections 
Altdorf has a side platform with a single track ( 1) and an island platform with two tracks ( 4–5).

Altdorf is a major hub for bus services in the Canton of Uri.  operates local bus services to Schattdorf, Seedorf, Isleten, Isenthal, Unterschächen, Spiringen, Bürglen, Attinghausen, Erstfeld, Silenen, and Amsteg.

Services
 the following services stop at Altdorf:

Other InterCity and EuroCity passenger trains pass through the station without stopping, as does the considerable freight traffic on the Gotthard route.

References

External links
 
 

Railway stations in the canton of Uri
Swiss Federal Railways stations